Stigmella regiella is a moth of the family Nepticulidae. It is found in most of Europe (except Iceland, Ireland, Portugal, Norway, Finland, the Baltic region and the southern part of the Balkan Peninsula), east to the eastern part of the Palearctic realm.

The wingspan is 4.5–5 mm.

The larvae feed on Midland hawthorn (Crataegus laevigata), common hawthorn (Crataegus monogyna) and medlar (Mespilus germanica). They mine the leaves of their host plant, which begins as a corridor that usually follows the leaf margin. After a moult, an elongated blotch is found, generally the direction of this blotch is opposite to that of the corridor.

References

Nepticulidae
Leaf miners
Moths of Europe
Moths of Asia
Moths described in 1855
Taxa named by Gottlieb August Wilhelm Herrich-Schäffer